Frizington is a village in Cumbria, England, historically part of Cumberland, near the Lake District National Park.

Historically, it was a collection of farms and houses, but became a unified village as a result of the mining (both coal and iron ore) opportunities in the area. The village is known for its church, which was built in 1867–1868.

Location

Etymology
"The name as a whole means 'tūn of Frisa' or 'of Frisa's people'" ('tūn' is Old English for 'homestead', 'village'; OE 'Frīsa' means 'the Frisian').

Governance
Frizington is within the Copeland UK Parliamentary constituency and the North West England European Parliamentary constituency. Trudy Harrison is the Member of parliament.

For the European Parliament residents in Frizington voted to elect MEP's for the North West England constituency.

Before Brexit, for  Local Government purposes it is in the Arlecdon + Ennerdale ward of the Borough of Copeland and the Cleator Moor East + Frizington ward of Cumbria County Council.

Frizington has its own Parish Council; Arlecdon & Frizington Parish Council, the civil parish of Arlecdon and Frizington, has a population of 3,678,

Notable people
Stephen Holgate, a professional rugby league player with a number of clubs, came from Frizington.

June 2010 shootings

On 2 June 2010, Frizington was the scene of the second murder in the killing spree known as the Cumbria shootings, when Derrick Bird shot his family solicitor, Kevin Commons.

See also

Listed buildings in Arlecdon and Frizington

References

External links
 Cumbria County History Trust: Arlecdon (nb: provisional research only – see Talk page)
Frizington Cumbria, from The Cumbria Directory.

Villages in Cumbria
Borough of Copeland